The Canton of Ailly-le-Haut-Clocher  is a former canton situated in the department of the Somme and in the Picardie region of northern France. It was disbanded following the French canton reorganisation which came into effect in March 2015. It consisted of 20 communes, which joined the canton of Rue in 2015. It had 7,793 inhabitants (2012).

Geography 
The canton is organised around the commune of Ailly-le-Haut-Clocher in the arrondissement of Abbeville. The altitude varies from 6m at Long to 136m  at Cramont for an average of 68m.

The canton comprised 20 communes:

Ailly-le-Haut-Clocher
Brucamps
Buigny-l'Abbé
Bussus-Bussuel
Cocquerel
Coulonvillers
Cramont
Domqueur
Ergnies
Francières
Gorenflos
Long
Maison-Roland
Mesnil-Domqueur
Mouflers
Oneux
Pont-Remy
Saint-Riquier
Villers-sous-Ailly
Yaucourt-Bussus

Population

See also
 Arrondissements of the Somme department
 Cantons of the Somme department
 Communes of the Somme department

References

Ailly-le-Haut-Clocher
2015 disestablishments in France
States and territories disestablished in 2015